Đậu Văn Toàn (born 7 April 1997) is a Vietnamese footballer who plays for Hà Nội as a centre-back and defensive midfielder.

Honours

Hà Nội
V.League 1: 2018, 2019, 2022; runner-up: 2020    
Vietnamese National Cup: 2019, 2020, 2022
Vietnamese Super Cup: 2019, 2020, 2021

External links

References

1997 births
Living people
Vietnamese footballers
Association football midfielders
V.League 1 players
Hanoi FC players